Kémes is a village in Baranya county, Hungary. It has an area of 6.89 km² and its population in 2019 was estimated at 438 inhabitants.

References

External links 
 https://web.archive.org/web/20090102033759/http://www.virtualpecs.hu/index.php?panoid=151 

Populated places in Baranya County